
This is a list of the 32 players who earned their 2009 European Tour card through Q School in 2008.

 2009 European Tour rookie

2009 Results

* European Tour rookie in 2009
T = Tied 
 The player retained his European Tour card for 2010 (finished inside the top 120).
 The player did not retain his European Tour Tour card for 2010, but retained conditional status (finished between 121-153).
 The player did not retain his European Tour card for 2010 (finished outside the top 153).

Winners on the European Tour in 2009

Runners-up on the European Tour in 2009

See also
2008 Challenge Tour graduates
2009 European Tour

References
Final Results
Player biographies and records

European Tour
European Tour Qualifying School Graduates